The Dangerous Journey is a children's picture book in the Moomin series by Tove Jansson. It was published in 1977. It follows the nightmarish adventures of Susanna, the Hemulen, Sniff, Sorry-Ooo and Thingummy & Bob through Moomin Valley.

English edition
The book was originally published in English by Ernest Benn, and translated by Kingsley Hart.

A new edition was published in the UK by Sort of Books in November 2010.

See also

Moomin

External links
The Moomin Trove

1977 children's books
Moomin books
Ernest Benn Limited books